Patkan may refer to:
 Patkan, Kerman
 Patkan, Sistan and Baluchestan